Sanne Denotté (born 22 March 1973, in Bornem) is a Belgian Flemish singer. She is famous in Flanders as a singer of Dutch-language vocal music, including Land van ons twee, the Dutch version of The Power of Love.

External links
 "Erik en Sanne" official website

References

1973 births
Living people
People from Bornem
21st-century Belgian women singers
21st-century Belgian singers